Moreno is a city in Buenos Aires Province, Argentina. It is the head town of Moreno Partido.

Moreno is bordered by Paso del Rey (east), Trujui and Cuartel V (north), Francisco Álvarez (west) and Merlo and Reconquista River (south).

History
The origin of the city goes back to 1860 when the Argentine railway company Camino de Hierro de Buenos Aires al Oeste opened a railway station on land donated by politician and composer, Amancio Jacinto Alcorta.

Education

The area has a German school, Deutsche Schule Moreno.

Notable residents
 Hebe Uhart (born 1936), writer and professor

References

External links

 Municipal website

Populated places in Buenos Aires Province
Populated places established in 1860
Moreno Partido
Cities in Argentina
1864 establishments in Argentina